Bi Wenjing (born 1981) is a Chinese gymnast. She competed at  the 1996 Summer Olympics in Atlanta, winning a silver medal in uneven bars, and placing fourth in the team competition with the Chinese team.

Competition history

References

External links

1981 births
Living people
Chinese female artistic gymnasts
Olympic gymnasts of China
Olympic silver medalists for China
Gymnasts at the 1996 Summer Olympics
Olympic medalists in gymnastics
Medalists at the World Artistic Gymnastics Championships
Gymnasts from Shandong
People from Tai'an
Asian Games medalists in gymnastics
Gymnasts at the 1998 Asian Games
Medalists at the 1996 Summer Olympics
Asian Games gold medalists for China
Medalists at the 1998 Asian Games
21st-century Chinese women